Altidona is a comune (municipality) in the Province of Fermo in the Italian region Marche, located about  southeast of Ancona and about  northeast of Ascoli Piceno.

Main sights
The walls
Medieval watchtower of Belvedere
Churches of Santa Maria and San Ciriaco
Villa Montana and Roman cistern, location of the now disappeared medieval castle
Parish church, with a painting by Vincenzo Pagani

References

External links
 Official website

Cities and towns in the Marche